Australia has been represented in weightlifting / powerlifting at every Games between 1964 and 2012 and, in that time, won a medal at every Games except 1984 and 2012. Paralympic powerlifting has been competed at every Summer Paralympics since 1984. Weightlifting had been on the Paralympic program since 1964, however after the 1992 Games the International Paralympic Committee made the decision drop weightlifting and hold powerlifting events only.

Notable Australian athletes include:
 Vic Renalson, has won 3 gold medals and 1 silver medal in weightlifting events. He also won 2 gold, 2 silver and 2 bronze medals in athletics events.
 Brian McNicholl, has won 1 gold medal, 1 silver medal and 2 bronze medals in weightlifting and powerlifting events.
 Darren Gardiner, has won 2 silver medals.

Medal table

Summer Paralympic Games
Australian representatives in weightlifting and powerlifting.

1964

Australia represented by: 
Men – Michael Dow, Gary Hooper, Vic Renalson
 
Australia won three silver medals.

1968

Australia represented by:  
Men – Gary Hooper, Vic Renalson

1972

Australia represented by: 
Men – Dennis Kay, Terry Mason, Vic Renalson

1976

Australia represented by: 
Men – Terry Mason, Vic Renalson

1980

Australia represented by: 
Men – Barry Kalms, Brian McNicholl, John Sheil

1984

Australia represented by: 
Men – Brian McNicholl 
Australia did not win any medals. Brian McNicholl came 4th in his event.

1988

Australia represented in powerlifting by: 
Men – Michael Farrell, Matthew Pobje 
Australia represented in weightlifting by: 
Men – Ray Epstein, Brian McNicholl, Arnie Money, Paul O'Brien, Col Richards

1992

Australia represented by: 
Men – Ray Epstein, Steve Green, Brian McNicholl

1996

 
Australia represented in powerlifting by: 
Men – Willem Bos, Michael Farrell, Brian McNicholl, Richard Nicholson  Coach – Blagoi Blagoev

2000

Australia represented in powerlifting by:

Men – Shaun Cavuoto,  Darren Gardiner, Steve Green, Paul Hyde, Richard Nicholson, Kahi Puru, Wayne Sharpe  Women – 
Deahnne McIntyre, Julie Russell, Vicky Machen, Kim Neuenkirchen, Melissa Trafela, Sue Twelftree  Coaches – Blagoi Blagoev (Head), Ray Epstein

2004

Australia represented in powerlifting: 
Men – Darren Gardiner, Steve Green, Wayne Sharpe  Women –  Deahnne McIntyre 
Coaches – Martin Leach (Coach), Michael Farrell

Gardiner originally finished third but was awarded the silver medal after Habibollah Mousavi gold medallist in +100 kg was disqualified after a positive doping test.

2008

Representing Australia in powerlifting: 
Men – Darren Gardiner, Abebe Fekadu   Women – Deahnne McIntyre   Coaches – Ray Epstein (Head Coach), Bill Nancarrow

2012

Selected team of 2 athletes. 
Men – Darren Gardiner and Abebe Fekadu. 
Coaches – Ray Epstein (Head) 
Darren Gardiner, a previous Games medallist competed at his fourth Games and Fekadu, a refugee from Ethiopia at his second Games. Australia did not win any medals.

2016
No athletes selected.

See also
 Powerlifting at the Summer Paralympics
 Weightlifting at the Summer Paralympics
 Australia at the Paralympics

References

Australian Paralympic teams
Powerlifting at the Summer Paralympics
Weightlifting in Australia